This is an index of energy articles.

A
Activation energy
- Alternative energy
- Alternative energy indexes
- American Museum of Science and Energy (AMSE)
- Anisotropy energy
- Atomic energy

B
Binding energy
- Bioenergy
- Black hole
- Breeder reactor
- Brown energy

C
Characteristic energy
- Conservation of energy
- Consol Energy

D
Dark energy
- Decay energy
- Direct Energy
- Dirichlet's energy
- Dyson's sphere

E
- Ecological energetics
- Electric Bond and Share Company
- Electric potential energy
- Electrochemical energy conversion
- Embodied energy
- Encircled energy
- Energy
- Energy accidents
- Energy accounting
- Energy amplifier
- Energy applications of nanotechnology
- Energy balance (biology)
- Energy bar
- Energy barrier
- Energy being
- Energy carrier
- Energy Catalyzer
- Energy cell
- Energy charge
- Energy conservation
- Energy conversion efficiency
- Energy crop
- Energy current
- Energy density
- Energy-depth relationship in a rectangular channel
- Energy development
- Energy-dispersive X-ray spectroscopy
- Energy distance
- Energy drift
- Energy drink
- Energy efficiency gap
- Energy-Efficient Ethernet
- Energy-efficient landscaping
- Energy elasticity
- Energy engineering
- Energy (esotericism)
- Energy expenditure
- Energy factor
- Energy field disturbance
- Energy filtered transmission electron microscopy
- Energy transfer
- Energy flow (ecology)
- Energy flux
- Energy forestry
- Energy functional
- Energy gel
- Energy harvesting
- Energy independence
- Energy input labeling
- Energy landscape
- Energy level
- Energy level splitting
- Energy management software
- Energy management system
- Energy–maneuverability theory
- Energy Manufacturing Co. Inc
- Energy medicine
- Energy–momentum relation
- Energy monitoring and targeting
- Energy Probe
- Energy profile (chemistry)
- Energy quality
- Energy recovery ventilation
- Energy security
- Energy (signal processing)
- Energy Slave
- Energy Star
- Energy statistics
- Energy Storage Challenge
- Energy storage
- Energy system
- Energy technology
- Energy tower (downdraft)
- Energy transfer
- Energy transfer upconversion
- Energy transformation
- Energy value of coal
- Energy vortex (stargate)
- Enthalpy
- Entropy
- Equipartition theorem
- E-statistic
- Exertion

F
Fermi energy
- Forms of energy
- Fuel
- Fusion power

G
Geothermal energy
- Gravitational energy
- Gravitational potential

H
History of energy
- Hydroelectricity

I
Interaction energy
- Intermittent energy source
- Internal energy
- Invariant mass
- Ionization energy

J
Josephson energy

K
Kinetic energy

L
Latent heat

M
Magnetic confinement fusion 
- Marine energy
- Mass–energy equivalence
- Mechanical energy
- Möbius energy
- Muzzle energy

N
Negative energy
- Nuclear fusion
- Nuclear power
- Nuclear reactor

O
Orders of magnitude (energy)
- Osmotic power

P
Photosynthesis
- Potential energy
- Power (physics)
- Primary energy

Q
Qi
- Quasar

R
Relativistic jet
- Renewable energy - Rotational energy

S
Seismic scale
- Solar energy
- Solar thermal energy
- Sound energy
- Specific energy
- Specific kinetic energy
- Specific orbital energy
- Surface energy

T
Thermodynamic free energy
- Threshold energy
- Tidal power
- Turbulence kinetic energy

U
Units of energy
- Universe of Energy

V
Vacuum energy

W
Watt meter
- Work (physics)
- World energy resources and consumption
- World Forum on Energy Regulation

Z
Zero-energy building
- Zero-energy universe
- Zero-point energy

See also
:Category:Energy-related lists
:Category:Energy organizations

Energy